Pietro Ceccarelli (born 16 February 1992) is an Italian professional rugby union player who primarily plays prop for Brive of the Top 14. He has also represented Italy at international level, having made his test debut against Ireland during the 2016 Six Nations Championship. Ceccarelli has previously played for clubs such as Lazio, La Rochelle, Mâcon, Zebre Parma, Oyonnax, and Edinburgh in the past.

Professional career 
After the experience with La Rochelle, he played for Zebre, in 2015–16 Pro12 and 2016–17 Pro12 seasons.
From 2018 to 2020 he come back to Pro14 with Edinburgh Rugby
In Top14 he also played with Oyonnax in 2017–18 Top 14 season.

From 2011 to 2012 Ceccarelli was named in the Italy Under 20 squad and from 2013 to 2015 in the Emerging Italy squad.

In March 2016 he was named in the Italian squad for the 2016 Six Nations Championship.

References

External links 

1992 births
Living people
Italian rugby union players
Italy international rugby union players
Rugby union props